Brian Robinson (born 1971) is a high school basketball coach for Bishop McGuinness High School in Kernersville, North Carolina. He led Bishop to 9 straight NCHSAA 1A state championships, which is a state record.  The Villains won their 10th State Championship in 2022.  He currently serves on the board to pick the North Carolina Gatorade Player-of-the-Year and is the WBCA (Women's Basketball Coaches Association) Chair for the National High School All-American Team. Robinson is the author of three books, and has been a speaker at basketball clinics for the University of Florida, Georgia Tech, and Duke University.   Was named one of the Top 100 High School Coaches in the 100 year history of the NCHSAA in 2013, known as a "Coach To Remember" in any sport, for either gender.   Robinson was named a Living Legend in 2010 by The Winston-Salem Recreation and Parks Department.

More on Coach R can be found on his LinkedIn Account.

Early years
Robinson attended R.J. Reynolds High School in Winston-Salem, North Carolina. He played for Coach Howard West . Robinson also was a baseball player. After graduating from high school, Robinson attended Appalachian State University, and graduated with a degree in Business Administration in 1994.  Robinson was an All-City Basketball Player as a JV member in 1988.  Robinson was named team captain of the R.J.R basketball and baseball teams in 1990.  Robinson was team MVP and All-Conference in baseball during the '90 season.  Robinson was the first ever student-athlete speaker at the inaugural R.J.R. Sports Banquet in 1990. Robinson was awarded the scholastic student-athlete of the year at Reynolds in 1990.

Coaching career
Robinson began his high school coaching career at his Alma mater, R.J. Reynolds High School, in Winston-Salem, NC. At Reynolds, Robinson coached the 9th Grade Boys' Team for two seasons, and was Varsity Boys' Assistant for two seasons. Robinson's 9th grade teams were 24-13 in his two seasons, while as a varsity assistant, the team won two CPC 4A Regular Season and Tournament Titles. The team made the State 4A Regionals in 1996-97, and the Sectional Finals in 1997-98. Robinson also coached JV Baseball at Reynolds for three seasons. Before coming to Bishop, Robinson spent the previous four seasons as Head Varsity Boys' Coach at Starmount High School in Yadkin County. Robinson's Teams made the state playoffs twice, and finished as high as third place in the Northwest 1A Conference in 1999-2000.   

Robinson coached one season of college basketball at Southeastern University in Lakeland, Florida as a women's basketball assistant.

Robinson founded The Winston-Salem Stealers Girls AAU / Club Basketball Program in 1996. The program has sent over 180 girls to play ball in college.  Robinson is also founder of the Teach The Game and CRC programs for girls basketball in the Triad Area.

Robinson is the director of The Maddawg Center Basketball Facility located in Kernersville, NC.  The Maddawg Center is on the campus formerly owned by Dudley Cosmetology Hair Products.

Bishop McGuinness
Robinson was named the head coach at Bishop in 2002. Under the direction of Robinson, Bishop won 9 straight state titles, which is a state record. Robinson was named the Northwest 1A Conference Coach of the Year in 2005-06 and 2008-09. Robinson was also a three-time Runner-Up for the NCHSAA State Coach of the Year in 2005-06, 2006–07, and 2011–12 as voted on by the Associated Press in North Carolina. In 2007-08 and 2012–13, Robinson was the second runner-up for the AP State Coach of the Year. In 2009-10 Robinson was selected as the Associated Press' State Coach of the Year. Robinson was also named Coach of the Year by the Greensboro News & Record in 2005-06, 2007–08 and 2011–12, by Triad Sports in 2005-06 and 2009–10, and by NCPreps.com in 2006-07. Robinson and the Bishop girls run of 9 straight titles ended with they lost to Hayesville 64-41 in the second round of the 2015 NCHSAA 1A tournament.   Robinson led the VIllains to the state playoffs in each of his twenty seasons at McGuinness.  The Villains have won 10 state titles, made 14 final fours, 16 elite eights, 17 sweet sixteens, 8 conference regular tournaments championships, and 6 regular season titles.  The Villains have been ranked twice in USA Today, in 2006 and 2007.

International coaching
In 2013, Robinson was named an assistant coach for the U-16 Women's National Basketball Team which won gold. Robinson was also an assistant coach for  the Under-17 USA Women's National Team in 2013 and 2014 where the team won gold medals both year.  He won a third gold medal in 2021 in Mexico working as support staff for USA Basketball's U16 women's national team. Robinson has worked with USA Basketball every year since 2007 working on the youth development side, the national team side, selection committees, legal certification gold license committees and as a speaker at clinics around the country.

References

1972 births
Living people
American men's basketball coaches
American men's basketball players
Appalachian State University alumni
Basketball coaches from North Carolina
High school basketball coaches in the United States
Basketball players from Winston-Salem, North Carolina